Patrick J. McKenna was a Major League Baseball center fielder who played in one game for the St. Louis Brown Stockings in .

McKenna died in 1922 in his home town of St Louis, Missouri of a cerebral hemorrhage.

References

External links

St. Louis Brown Stockings players
Major League Baseball outfielders
19th-century baseball players
1854 births
1922 deaths